Penicillium grevilleicola is a species of the genus of Penicillium which was isolated from Grevillea ilicifolia.

References

grevilleicola
Fungi described in 2014